"Curse of the Mutants" is a comics storyline that ran in books published by the American company Marvel Comics from July 2010 to May 2011. The arc centers on a human bomb exploding in San Francisco's Union Square, covering dozens (including Jubilee) in vampire-converting blood. It then becomes the mission of the X-Men to track down Dracula's son Xarus, now "Lord of the Vampires", even if that means enlisting vampire-hunter Blade.

Publication history
The main writer of the storyline is Victor Gischler, who wrote Death of Dracula#1, the one-shot issue which started the storyline, as well as the new ongoing series X-Men (vol. 3), which forms the main part of the storyline.

There is also a four-issue miniseries that links in with "Curse of the Mutants", Namor the First Mutant by Stuart Moore, as well as a two-issue miniseries X-Men vs. Vampires by various creators and a number of one-shot issues: Blade by Duane Swierczynski, Storm and Gambit by Chuck Kim and Smoke and Blood by Simon Spurrier.

A four-issue miniseries by Kathryn Immonen and Phil Noto that ties into the storyline, called Wolverine and Jubilee: Cursed, started in January 2011.

Plot summary
The story begins with Dracula at a vampire summit. His son Xarus plans to overthrow him due to his "bad leadership". Xarus had met with the leaders of each vampire clan and makes a deal that unites the Claw Sect (a clan of vampire warriors), the Charniputra Sect (a clan of gargoyle-like vampires), the Mystikos Sect (a clan of business vampires), the Nosferatu Sect (who are similar to Count Orlok), the Krieger Sect (a clan of Western vampires), the Atlantean Sect (a race/clan of aquatic vampires that resemble the Gill-man from the film Creature from the Black Lagoon), the Moksha Sect (a clan of vampire seers) and the Siren Sect (a clan of vampire seductresses). Xarus and his allies stake Dracula, enabling Xarus to assume leadership over the vampires. Xarus' allies in the Mystikos Sect managed to invent a special device that can block the frequencies of light that are harmful to vampires. Xarus decides to use this device to create a new, dominant place in the world for vampires. Upon attacking the fortress of the Krieger Sect, Xarus' allies eliminate the clan's elder leadership. He has the Claw Sect not declare itself for him, so it can hang back and be contacted by any would-be traitors seeking an alliance - like his brother Janus Tepes and the peaceful Anchorite Sect. Following an attempted betrayal from the Siren Sect, Xarus foolishly allows its leader Alyssa to live and keep serving him. Alyssa secretly slips one of the light-deflecting pendants to Janus, which enables him to escape after the Claw Sect betray him to Xarus. While wearing a light-deflecting pendant, Xarus declares himself Lord of the Vampires in front of his vampire army.

Cyclops sends Pixie out to check up on Jubilee. As the two women are enjoying themselves at an outdoor cafe, a man sizzles and explodes in the sunlight. Blood and parts of the man's body cover many in the square, including Jubilee. After testing her blood, it is determined that Jubilee was infected during the explosion by a manufactured virus. That night, the other people infected by the virus during the explosion respond to the call of the vampires. However, the vampires are disappointed that Jubilee (whom they appear to be waiting for specifically) is not there. The X-Men quickly determine that they are dealing with vampires.

Blade arrives in San Francisco to assist the X-Men in capturing a vampire specimen for the X-Club. He confirms Dracula's death and reveals that Dracula's son Xarus is the new Lord of the Vampires, having united many vampire clans together. He immediately objects to Cyclops' plan to resurrect Dracula. Much later, while the X-Men gather to discuss the death of Dracula and learn who the new Lord of Vampires is, Dr. Kavita Rao is seen checking on Jubilee, only to be attacked. Jubilee leaves Utopia to see Xarus, who bites her. It is also revealed that Xarus only wants Jubilee so the X-Men can go rescue her and fall into a trap...especially Wolverine.

While underwater, Namor has an encounter with a race of Atlantean vampires and is tasked with retrieving the head of Dracula. Storm and Gambit are sent to steal the headless body of Dracula from the vampires. Blade later has an encounter with Xarus, who tells Blade his plans to take over San Francisco.

While attempting to free Jubilee, Wolverine is bitten by her. At the same time, the X-Men resurrect Dracula, who declines to help them and says that he will deal with this himself.

As X-Club members Madison Jeffries, Kavita Rao, and Doctor Nemesis work on a cure for the vampirism, their test subject escapes and the lab goes into lockdown.

Upon Wolverine being added to the ranks of Xarus' army, the X-Men prepare to fight Xarus' vampire armies.

The Vampire Nation has gathered its forces for an assault on Utopia. Cyclops has prepared his defenses for this attack: only the literally tough-skinned X-Men for combat, while the others remain inside the compound; the Archangel has prepped himself for air defense; and the Iceman is having his very body blessed by a priest in an attempt to make it holy. The battle then begins, as the vampires attempt to press onto Utopia through land, air and sea. The ground and air forces stop, as Wolverine lands down and plows through his former comrades. Cyclops then presses the button on a remote that Doctor Nemesis gave him, which causes Wolverine to rear down in pain. It is revealed that before Wolverine went out on his hunt for Jubilee, he had his blood taken to see if his healing factor could counteract vampirism. But unknown to him, Nemesis has injected him with nanobots to shut down his healing factor, as Cyclops had anticipated that he might be bitten and turned before they could reactivate it. Back to his normal self, Wolverine turns on the vampires as the X-Men and Atlanteans push them out. Wolverine then warns Xarus over the video that he will be coming for him. Unfazed, Xarus orders that a second wave be sent in. However, his aide informs him that they sent in all their available forces and it may take time for a new strike force to be organized. But Xarus will have none of it, declaring that he will take Utopia today, raise a flag over it, stand over Wolverine's bones and drink Cyclops' blood. Just then, Dracula walks in, reasserting himself as Lord of the Vampires. He grants amnesty  to the other vampire sects for betraying him, all except Xarus. With the sudden return of his father Dracula, Xarus tries ordering his minions to help him, but receives no support. While the X-Men storm his lair, Xarus decides to deal with his father himself. But this time, Dracula is more careful and repays the favor by ripping off Xarus' head. It is then that the X-Men enter. Whereas Cyclops wants nothing more to do with the Vampire Nation, Blade does not see eye-to-eye with him and charges at Dracula, only to knocked unconscious with an optic blast. Cyclops then reminds Dracula of their previous, unspoken agreement. However, the Lord of the Vampires muses that if his son was successful in uniting the vampire sects into one functional alliance, then perhaps he may finish what he started: conquer Utopia. Cyclops reminds him that before they reunited his head with his body, X-Club was studying it, meaning that he has a trick up his sleeve. After a brief staredown, Dracula calls Cyclops' bluff, but nonetheless, decides to end hostilities with mutants. He even gives Jubilee back to them. Back at Utopia, Jubilee is put in isolation. Blade believes that the only solution is to put her out of her misery. Wolverine warns him not to, prompting the vampire hunter to leave. While watching on the monitor, Cyclops and Emma wonder if Jubilee can be cured.

Involved issues
July
 X-Men: Curse of the Mutants Saga
 Death of Dracula #1 "Curse of the Mutants" prologue
 X-Men #1 "Curse of the Mutants" Chapter 1

August
 X-Men #2 "Curse of the Mutants" Chapter 2
 Namor the First Mutant #1 "Curse of the Mutants" tie-in
 X-Men: Curse of the Mutants - Blade #1 "Curse of the Mutants" tie-in
 X-Men: Curse of the Mutants - Storm and Gambit #1 "Curse of the Mutants" tie-in

September
 X-Men #3 "Curse of the Mutants" Chapter 3
 X-Men: Curse of the Mutants - X-Men vs. Vampires #1 "Curse of the Mutants" tie-in
 X-Men: Curse of the Mutants - Smoke and Blood #1 "Curse of the Mutants" tie-in
 Namor the First Mutant #2 "Curse of the Mutants" tie-in

October
 X-Men: Curse of the Mutants - X-Men vs. Vampires #2 "Curse of the Mutants" tie-in
 Namor the First Mutant #3 "Curse of the Mutants" tie-in
 X-Men #4 "Curse of the Mutants" Chapter 4

November
 X-Men #5 "Curse of the Mutants" Chapter 5
 X-Men: Curse Of The Mutants Spotlight #1
 Namor the First Mutant #4 "Curse of the Mutants" tie-in

December
 X-Men #6 "Curse of the Mutants" Chapter 6
 Deadpool #30 "Curse Of The Mutants"

January
 Deadpool #31 "Curse Of The Mutants"

May
 X-Men #11 "Curse of the Mutants: Blood Hunt"
 Wolverine and Jubilee: Curse of the Mutants #1-4

Collected editions

See also
 List of events of the Marvel Universe

References

External links
 "Curse of the Mutants" at the Marvel Database Project
 "Curse of the Mutants" at the Heroic Age blog

Reviews

Review: Curse of the Mutants: X-Men vs. Vampires #1, Comic Book Resources
Review: Curse of the Mutants: Blade #1, Comic Book Resources
Review: X-Men: Curse of the Mutants – Storm and Gambit #1, Comic Book Resources

2010 comics debuts